The 2018–19 Qatar Volleyball league was the 40th season of the Qatar Volleyball league, the highest professional volleyball league in Qatar. A total of 10 teams will compete in the league. The season began on 22 October 2018 and is scheduled to conclude on 26 March 2019. Al Rayyan are the defending champions.

Police SC won their second Qatar Volleyball league title.

League table

|}

Final standings

References

External links 
 Official Website 

Qatar Volleyball league
Qatar Volleyball league
volleyball in Qatar
2018 in Qatari sport
2019 in Qatari sport